DBC may refer to:

 Database connection libraries, e.g., JDBC
 IATA code for Baicheng Chang'an Airport
 dBc, decibels relative to carrier, a measurement in RF engineering
 dB(C), C-weighted decibels, a loudness measurement in acoustics
 DBC News, a Bangladeshi news channel
 DBC Pierre (born 1961), Australian-born author
 Dead Brain Cells, a Canadian thrash metal band
 Design by contract, a methodology for designing computer software
 Detroit Boat Club, a historic rowing club
 Digital Broadcasting Corporation (Hong Kong), a radio broadcasting corporation
 Dread Broadcasting Corporation, the UKs first black music radio station
 The Devastating Beat Creator, stage name of Martin Nemley, a member of the American hip hop band Stetsasonic
 Direct Bonded Copper, a power electronic substrate
 Direct-buried cable, a kind of electrical cable

See also
 DBC 1012, a computer produced by Teradata Corporation in the early 1980s
 DBC1, a human protein
 Deleted in Breast Cancer 1, a human protein
 DBCS (disambiguation)